Sardar Dyal Singh Majithia (1848–1898) was  an Indian banker and activist in progressive and social reform measures in Punjab. He established The Tribune newspaper in Lahore in 1881, and later remained founder chairman of the Punjab National Bank, established in 1894. Dyal Singh trust also opened a school at village Mirjajan, Tehsil Batala, District Gurdaspur, Punjab and also donated many acres of land to the school,which is running successfully under the name of Dyal Singh Govt. Sen. Sec. School Mirjajan.

Biography
Born in Varanasi, Dyal Singh was the son of General Lehna Singh of the renowned Majithia family of Punjab. He got his early education in the Mission School at Amritsar and was later self-educated.

He founded the newspaper The Tribune and managed the affairs of the Harmandir Sahib ("Golden Temple") for nearly thirty years. He took up business in real estate and diamonds and earned huge wealth. He was the first president of the Indian Association of Lahore and continued in that capacity till his death.  He was a founding Trustee of the Sadharan Brahmo Samaj.

He was Chairman, Board of Directors of the country's first indigenous bank, the Punjab National Bank. The Bank was founded on 23 May 1894 (its first meeting was held at 6:30 PM at Dyal Singh's house). At the second meeting on 27 May 1894, Dyal Singh was appointed Chairman and Lala Harkishen Lal, the Secretary of the Board. He was also a pillar of the Brahmo Samaj and donated liberally for educational institutions and libraries, including numerous colleges all over Northern India, like Dayal Singh College, Lahore and Dyal Singh Memorial Library, Lahore. He was closely associated with Punjab University.

Legacy
The Tribune newspaper founded by him is still a popular English daily. He willed his property for establishing college for secular education, initially resulting in creation of Dayal Singh College (Lahore), later also Dyal Singh College, Delhi and Dyal Singh College, Karnal.

References

External links
 Biography at Dyal Singh Memorial Trust Library, Lahore
 Government Dayal Singh College, Lahore
 Dyal Singh College Delhi
 Dyal Singh College Karnal
 Dyal Singh Public School Jagadhari
 Dyal Singh Public School Karnal
 Dyal Singh Public School Sector 7 Karnal
 Dayal Singh Trust Library Lahore
 Sardar Dyal Singh Majithia

1848 births
1898 deaths
Indian bankers
Indian newspaper founders
Punjabi people
Brahmos
Activists from Varanasi
Writers from Varanasi
19th-century Indian journalists
19th-century Indian male writers
19th-century Indian businesspeople
Businesspeople from Varanasi
19th-century Indian philanthropists